St Mary's Church, Totnes is a Grade I listed parish church in the Church of England Diocese of Exeter in Totnes, Devon.

History
The church was built as part of the Benedictine Priory of St Mary. The townspeople came to an arrangement with the priory for the complete rebuilding in the 15th century, and the church was rebuilt in sections with the nave being done first between 1432 and 1444, the chancel between 1445 and 1448, the tower between 1449–59 and the screen from 1459 to 1460. The mason Roger Crowden is noted as having designed the tower, and given the similarity in style for the rest of the church, he may be responsible for the whole works. The pillars are similar in design to St Mary's Church, Brixham and both churches may have shared an architect.

The church is noted for the monument to Walter Smith who died in 1555. It is erected in the south chancel aisle and comprises a tomb-chest in an ogee recess with quatrefoil decoration.

The candelabra in brass was installed in 1701.

In 1824 the outer north aisle was added. This north aisle was modified in 1869 by Sir Gilbert Scott who added additional seating which allowed for the removal of the western galleries and the galleries in the rood loft.

Vicars

Organ

The church is likely to have contained an organ before the reformation. The first post-Reformation organ was installed in 1720 and survived until 1817. A new organ by Flight and Robson was then installed.

The basis of the current instrument is a pipe organ which was built by Father Henry Willis for the Great Exhibition in 1851 and installed and opened by him in Totnes on Sunday 11 August 1861.  It has since had subsequent restorations and modifications and now comprises 3 manuals and pedals with 33 speaking stops. A specification of the organ can be found in the National Pipe Organ Register.

Organists
William Reeve 1781 - 1783
William Coombe 1802 - 1811 (formerly organist at Chard, Somerset, afterwards organist of Chelmsford)
Henry Compton ca. 1818 - 1858 
John Horth Deane 1859 - 1864 (formerly organist of St John's Church, Torquay and Beccles Church, Suffolk)
Herr Eberlein 1864 - 1867 (formerly organist of St Peter's Church, Tiverton, afterwards organist of St Leonard's Church, Exeter)
Richard Sparke Distin ca. 1870
Herbert Worth 1878 - 1929
Anthony B. Kitson 1930 - ca. 1938

Bells
The tower contains a peal of 8 bells. Four bells date from 1732 by Abraham Rudhall, two from 1863 by John Warner and Sons, one from 1897 by John Warner and sons, and the last from 1935 by Gillett & Johnston.

References

Totnes
Totnes
Totnes